Tooting is a railway station serving Tooting in South London; it is within Travelcard Zone 3. Tooting spans two boroughs with the station located on their common boundary thus the station is located in the London Borough of Merton but fronts onto the London Borough of Wandsworth. 
The station is served by Thameslink trains on the Sutton Loop Line.

History
The station opened in 1894 as Tooting Junction, replacing an earlier station of the same name, which was located a few hundred yards west and had opened in 1868. It was renamed Tooting in 1938, following the closure of the branch line from Tooting to Merton Park to passenger traffic in 1929.

Prior to the introduction of Thameslink services it was served by the London Bridge loop trains via Wimbledon.

Services
All services at Tooting are operated by Thameslink using  EMUs.

The typical off-peak service in trains per hour is:
 2 tph to 
 2 tph to  via 

Connections
London Buses routes 44, 77, 264, 270, 280 and 355 and night route N44 serve the station.

References

External links

Railway stations in the London Borough of Merton
Former Tooting, Merton and Wimbledon Railway stations
Railway stations in Great Britain opened in 1894
Railway stations in Great Britain closed in 1917
Railway stations in Great Britain opened in 1923
Railway stations served by Govia Thameslink Railway
Railway station